In information technology (IT), remote support tools are IT tools and software that enable an IT technician or a support representative to connect to a remote computer from their consoles via the Internet and work directly on the remote system. Although its main focus is the access to computers located anywhere in the world, the remote support applications also provide features like file transfer, desktop sharing, file synchronization, command line or guest accessibility.

Privacy 
Privacy is also a major concern for all users. One of the most used tools in remote support sessions are the ones that allow desktop sharing. It is also possible to provide what is commonly called Unattended Support (the technician is granted total remote access to the client’s computer, even when he is not physically close to it). 
The need for an absolute trust in these services and providers is considered to be the biggest obstacle for this technology to achieve mass-marketing status – even when many studies indicate that for every 5 technical occurrences, 4 of them could be remotely solved.

Benefits 
Remote Support technology tries to reduce helpdesk centers cost-issues – all transport-related expenses are immediately trimmed down, for instance.
Modern day technology enables that any technician using Remote Support is able to assist a customer just like it was physically side-by-side. Technologies and tools like live chat, VoIP and desktop sharing enable a direct intervention in the remote system.

See also 
 Desktop sharing
 File transfer
 File synchronization
 WHICH INDUSTRIES ARE USING AR REMOTE SUPPORT?

References 

Remote desktop